Comitas silicicola is an extinct species of sea snail, a marine gastropod mollusc in the family Pseudomelatomidae.

Description

Distribution
This extinct marine species was found in late Eocene strata  in the Pallinup Formation, Eucla Basin, Western Australia

References

External links
 Darragh, T. A. (2017). Further Mollusca from the late Eocene Pallinup Formation, Eucla Basin, Western Australia. Records of the West Australian Museum 32: 29-100

silicicola
Gastropods described in 2017
Gastropods of Australia